Piyush Trivedi (born September 13, 1958) is an Indian academician. He is the Founder Head of the School of Pharmaceutical Sciences, Rajiv Gandhi Proudyogiki Vishwavidyalaya, Bhopal, and is the former Vice Chancellor of Rajiv Gandhi Proudyogiki Vishwavidyalaya, the University of Technology of Madhya Pradesh.

Career

Professor Trivedi started his career in teaching at Holkar Science College in 1981. His career at RGPV started as the Founder and head of the School of Pharmaceuticals in the year 2003. He was appointed as the Vice-Chancellor of the University in July 2008. As vice chancellor of the university, he implemented a lot of changes during his tenure, which spanned more than 8 years. He introduced the Chancellor's Scholarship Award for meritorious students, in which the students with exceptional academic and extracurricular credentials are awarded the scholarship.

The scholarship is conferred to the students by the Governor of the state who also happens to be the Chancellor of the University. He introduced RGPV Service portal for E-Governance, transparency and convenience. Through the University portal approximately 175000 enrolled students of the University are provided with a unique identification. Other implementations include the introduction of E-Library, Establishment of Multiple centers of excellence, Startup Fund for Student Entrepreneurs, Scholarship for students from Economically Backward Sections.

The Government of Madhya Pradesh has appointed Prof. Trivedi as Director of M.P. Power Generating Co. Ltd. in the year 2009. Prof. Trivedi had been involved in various capacities, such as the Regional Committee of AICTE, Executive Council of M.P. Council of Science & Technology etc.

On 27 December 2012, Government revised his working duration considering his impressive records and re-appointed him as Vice-Chancellor. He completed his second tenure as Vice Chancellor in December 2016.

References

1958 births
Living people